The Commando Regiment is an elite light infantry and is considered the first special forces regiment in the Lebanese Armed Forces.  The regiment, which was founded in 1966, is also a member of the Lebanese Special Operations Command and is the largest of the Lebanese special units. An individual member of the regiment is a maghwār (Levantine Arabic: مَغْوَار, or commando, derived from غَارَ ghāra = "he raided".)

History
The regiment was founded in October 1966 under the instructions of the commander-in-chief, General Emile Boustany.  During the Lebanese Civil War, the regiment was divided among the different divided commands. A result of one of the divisions was the foundation of the counter-sabotage regiment or Al-Moukafaha.

The regiment has long been considered the only special unit and commando regiment among the other Lebanese Army regiments. However, with the introduction of the other special regiments, such as the Marine Commandos, this regiment is no longer considered as such. Nevertheless, the term "Maghaweer" still means to civilians the strongest unit that is available for the hardest tasks, and still refers to this specific regiment. The regiment is also the only parental formation in the Lebanese Army to include soldiers from all sects and regions of Lebanon in equal proportion, though Maronite and Eastern Orthodox are a slight majority in the officer corps, while Shia are a slight majority in the NCO corps.

Foundation
According to Major General Mahmoud Tay Abou-Dargham, the founder of the regiment,  the idea came to discussions in 1960 by the commander-in-chief of the Lebanese Armed Forces General Emile Boustany. In 1966, the command took the decision and called after Captain Abou-Dargham who was ordered to start establishing a commando unit. The initial size was specified to be 250 soldiers, and thus Captain Abou-Dargham started the recruitment process to achieve that number. In addition to the recruited soldiers, trainer officers were chosen to conduct the training, among them Colonel Commando Makhoul Hakmé and Colonel Commando Nabih Farhat who followed commando courses at the Saika school in Egypt.  The new unit was equipped with Beretta rifles from the army reserves, and dressed in a unique uniform.

The first commando course lasted for two months, and the result came up shockingly short to the LAF command. Only 65 out of the initial 250 soldiers were able to complete the course.  The commander of the LAF General Boustani called after Captain Abou-Dargham inquiring about the result, and complaining about the low numbers. Subsequently, another course was made, resulting in an increase to 150 commandos.

Uniform and insignia

The official uniform is a digital pattern similar to the MARPAT Woodland. The regiment also uses a Tigerstripe pattern of dark and light green and very light and dark brown, that's in addition to the U.S. style Woodland Camouflage fatigues. Desert boots were newly employed by the regiment. Prior to 2008 the official boot was a brown one. The beret is a bordeaux beret, as all the "Maghaweer" units in the LAF, with the regiment's insignia and a metallic LAF logo.

The regiment's shoulder badge, has a red background with a Tiger face and sword held by a hand behind it. The name of the regiment is placed at the top of the insignia in Arabic.

The maroon berets are worn by the Army Rangers Regiment known as MAGHAWEER and by the Marine Commandos known as MAGHAWEER EL BAHR. The current commander in chief General Joseph Aoun, himself having been in MAGHAWEER, allowed military personnel who have a RANGER badge to keep wearing their maroon berets even when serving in other non special forces units. The current Military Council (6 members) includes 2 MAGHAWEER General Joseph Aoun and Major General Georges Chreim.

Weapons, equipment and vehicles
The units weapons consist of mainly U.S. and French weapons, various weapons are used such as the M4 Carbine assault rifle with M203 grenade launcher, M16 and assault rifles, M249 SAW, FN MAG, Barrett M107 .50 Cal. sniper, M24 sniper, Steyr SSG 69, SVD rifle, M72 LAW, At-4, Mk 19 grenade launcher, M141 Bunker Defeat Munition, various mortars.

The list of vehicles include M113, M113 OPFOR, VAB, Panhard AML 90, AIFV-B-C25, HMMWV, CUCV, M151 jeep, and M35 trucks. The main camouflage of the vehicles is a 3 tone (green, beige, and black) digital pattern. They also use a  Tigerstripe camouflage similar to that of the uniform, woodland and white camouflage.

Selection and training 
A soldier candidate is selected based on a sports test, a general information test, and a medical test.  After successfully passing these three tests, the candidates undergo an intensive course in the regiment for one month.  This course includes various sports: climbing, rope-handling, spear-fighting, close combat, aerial journeys, and walking with full gear.  This course intends to prepare the candidates to follow a commando course for two months at the Lebanese Army Special Forces School|Special Forces School, after which graduates follow the companies of the Regiment, and follow additional specialization training in explosives, effective use of arms, reading maps, signals, and first aid procedures. After that stage, soldiers are prepared to get used to combat within a squad, then a platoon, then a company.

Annual course for new soldiers
The annual training program for the newly joined soldiers in the regiment is composed of three stages:

Preparatory stage
This stage lasts one month, it prepares non-commissioned officers trainers after following studies in training techniques. In addition to preparing the training program, selecting the special studies to be included, and selecting the training sites. Selecting the sites takes into consideration having a variety of locations with different terrains, nature, and weather conditions.

Moreover, this stage involves preparing the orientation plans, according to the plans published by the orientation directorate, in addition to sports competitions based on which companies are evaluated.

Technical training
This stage lasts three months, it prepares the soldiers technically, for this reason they follow various courses such as driving various vehicles including jeeps, trucks, trailers, APCs, and snowmobiles. This stage also includes training on arms-handling, in addition to educational sessions on using computers, secretariat, and signals.

Tactical training
This stage lasts for eight months, it includes all levels of combat courses, starting with special training for individual fighting, followed by training on operations within a squad, up to the level of a platoon, and ultimately to a company level and a tactical branch level. The goal behind this is to create harmony and good coordination among the group regardless of its size.

A raiding course is taken annually by all the soldiers at the Special Forces School.  In addition, soldiers stay off-base for four days, during which they perform special combat operations that include reconnaissance patrols, raids, ambushes (during day & night, against vehicles and soldiers), tracing, chasing, storming, and destroying artillery emplacements.

A course on dealing with helicopters is also taken by all soldiers.  During this course they get to know the capabilities of the helicopters, and learn how to equip it and prepare it to perform a tactical mission. Soldiers also train on jumping out of helicopters from low altitudes onto land and into sea, and also train on landing from helicopters using ropes.  This course is finalized by conducting a tactical maneuver during which soldiers perform an airborne operation using helicopters on a specific area to perform a mission, given that the helicopter will return later to pick them up at a specific time from another predetermined check point.  A unit that fails to reach the check point in time to catch up to the helicopter is left where it is and has to return to the main meeting point of all units on foot.

Selecting NCO trainers
A non-commissioned officer who is planning to become a commando trainer must be a graduate of the Teaching Institute, and must have followed a commando course, explosives course, and a storming course. In addition, candidates are selected according to qualifications related to leadership and the individual's ability to command. These trainers, follow additional special courses to further develop their experience, enhance their self-confidence, and rehabilitate their intellectual and physical capabilities.

Annual training camp
The regiment conducts a large scale training camp on a yearly basis, this training lasts three months, and includes similar training to the tactical stage of the new soldiers.

During this camp, soldiers follow special commando combat training, in addition to survival training, where soldiers are left alone is a deserted area without food, water, or any mean to aid them. Soldiers have to cope with nature, sustain themselves in face of harsh conditions, and perform the requested mission. Soldiers at this stage are also deprived from having enough sleep, as they are only allowed to sleep for two to three hours a day.
Every stage of the training is finalized by a tactical maneuver with live ammunition.

Specialized scheduled courses
In addition to the annual training program, the regiment always hosts specialized courses followed by specialized soldiers from the various companies accordingly. Among these specialized courses are:

 Sniper course
 Explosives course, for soldiers specialized in engineering
 Climbing course, for mountain combat soldiers
 Signals course
 Medical course, as every squad includes a medic

On-going training
Each commando performs four firing sessions per year performed over the different seasons.  Although, sniper specialists perform firing sessions once per month each year; a total of 12 times per year.

An in-base race of 5 km is performed by soldiers each month with full gear on.  In addition, a general sports assessment on the regiment level is performed twice a year, and four times on company level.

Mountain Combat Company  
Established on February 11, 1998 Founder General Joe Haddad,  with the assistance of the French army,  as a branch specialized in Mountain warfare and directly related to the Lebanese Army command. However, it was included in the commando regiment as a member company as of 1999.  The company is headquartered at Soukour al-Kimam military base (Mountain Hawks military base). The head count of trained mountains soldiers reached the level of 2 combat companies in preparation to a full-fledged Mountains Combat Regiment.

Present organization
The Company includes:

 Three Mountain Combat Platoons
 One support platoon 
 One Supply and equipment platoon
 Company Command

Training and courses
The principles and basics of combat are applied the same; however in a mean that suits the type of land and weather condition where this company is active. The members of the company follow several gradual courses for that purpose, as follows:

 Fundamental course in military skiing, lasts for eight weeks, it includes a theoretical and application study for the skiing and military skiing techniques, moving and taking cover methods in the snow, medical evacuation, firing in snowy and high altitude conditions, tactical training on reconnaissance and ambushes, and constructing and reinforcing combat stations in snow areas.
 Fundamental course in military climbing, lasts for five weeks, it includes studies on climbing techniques, climbing safety measures, rope-handling, preparing mountain passes and then crossing them, techniques on crossing hard terrain mountains, and medical evacuation from rock shelves.
 Commander of a mountainous unit course, spans two phases during winter and summer.  Each phase lasts for three weeks.
 Tactical course on mountain combat (in winter & summer), this course is considered a total training that includes the special techniques used in mountainous areas learned at the fundamental course stage, and how to apply them in tactical operations in mountains during winter and summer.

Two French Army teams annually train the members of the company over both stages (winter and summer).  In addition, some officers and soldiers, follow related courses in France.

Emblem
The emblem of the company is made out of an angry wolf face with a trumpet around it, decorated by a cedar.  Each symbol has a specific meaning:
 The wolf: Represents the small independent units that roam the mountains in all weather conditions.
 The spear: Symbol of the special units.
 The Trumpet: Symbolizes calling all units in the mountains to gather.

Operation Nahr el-Bared
During Operation Nahr el-Bared, the head of this company, Colonel Ibrahim Salloum, was injured twice; however, he insisted to remain in the battle and ended up dying from a fatal gunshot.

Operational deployments
This regiment was always among the first to be called upon to hot spots in the country.  It has a long history of operations, especially during the Liberation War against Syria.

This table does not include all the missions

In addition to those operations, the Commando Regiment was used to restore and maintain order in some Lebanese cities at different occasions whenever major clashes or civil strife took place.

See also 
 Rangers Sports Events (Lebanon)
 Tomb of the Unknown Soldier in Lebanon
 Lebanese Special Operations Command
 Marine Commandos

References 

Special forces of Lebanon
Military special forces regiments
Military units and formations established in 1966